The Follower is the fifth studio album by Swedish electronic music producer Axel Willner under his alias The Field. It was released by Kompakt on 1 April 2016.

Track listing

Charts

References

2016 albums
The Field (musician) albums
Kompakt albums